The 1955 World Fencing Championships were held in Rome, Italy.

Medal table

Medal summary

Men's events

Women's events

References

FIE Results

World Fencing Championships
International fencing competitions hosted by Italy
1950s in Rome
1955 in Italian sport
Sports competitions in Rome
1955 in fencing